Bankstown Oval (officially known as Bankstown Memorial Oval)  is a multi-purpose stadium in Sydney, Australia.  It is currently used mostly for cricket matches and has been used by New South Wales, particularly for one day matches.  It has also hosted 4 first class games in the Sheffield Shield.  Its pavilion is named after Australian Test batsmen Steve and Mark Waugh, who both appeared for the Bankstown club.  It hosted a Women's Ashes test on England's 2002/3 tour and again in January 2010. The ground has also been used for local AFL matches. The stadium currently has a capacity of 8,000 people.

In the 1940s and 1950s it was the home ground of the Bankstown Soccer Club.

References

External links
 

Cricket grounds in New South Wales
Sports venues in Sydney
Bankstown, New South Wales
Multi-purpose stadiums in Australia
Soccer venues in Sydney